Boryspil Bus Factory is a private Ukrainian manufacturer of buses located in the village of Prilysky near Boryspil, owned by parent company Etalon Corporations.

History 
The plant has been founded in 2002 in Prolisky settlement in Kyiv Oblast in Ukraine on the basis of the enterprise UkrVolgaTechService, which has been producing GAZ passenger cars and trucks since 1998. The plant was re-profiled for the licensed production of pickups and trucks of the Indian company Tata.

The Boryspil Bus Factory is a part of Etalon Corporation, which is based on the idea of creating and producing a wide range of vehicles for various purposes to meet the needs of both the domestic market and markets of other countries.

Alongside the production of cargo vehicles BAZ began to use Indian chassis for installing a Ukrainian-built passenger bodies on them, this way the company has become a leading supplier of buses in the Ukrainian market. In 2003 the plant has produced over 400 vehicles.

From the beginning BAZ was ordering the design for their vehicles from Lviv's UkrAvtobusProm institute that was already designing buses for LAZ since 1960's. Their first bus was put in production in 2002, it was BAZ A079 based on Indian truck Tata LPT.

Models

Buses

As of 2021 at the factory produced the following models of buses:
 BAZ-2215 "Dolphin" - small class minibus produced mainly at Chernihiv Bus Factory
 BAZ-A074 "Chornobryvets" - tourist bus produced mainly at Chernihiv Bus Factory (Photo)
 BAZ-A079
 BAZ-A081
 BAZ-A148
 BAZ-A11110

Other vehicles

 BAZ-T713 - pickup truck, tow truck;
 BAZ-T9016 "Podorozhnyk";
 BAZ-T1116 - people carrier;
 BAZ-T1518 - pickup truck, grain truck, people carrier;
 BAZ-T1618.

References

Bus manufacturers of Ukraine
Ukrainian companies established in 2002